Binny is a surname and given name which may refer to:

People:
Binny Bansal, Indian billionaire, software engineer and entrepreneur
Binny Yanga (1958–2015), Indian social worker
Archibald Binny (1762/3-1838), co-founder of Binny & Ronaldson, which established the first permanent type foundry in the United States
Roger Binny (born 1955), Indian former test cricket player
Stuart Binny (born 1984), Indian first class cricket player, son of Roger Binny
Vinod Kumar Binny (born 1973), Indian politician

Fictional characters:
Binny Baumann, title character of Binny and the Ghost, a German television series

Businesses:
 Binny's Beverage Depot, chain of liquor stores

See also
Mesopotamichthys sharpeyi or binni, a fish species
Binny and Co., a defunct shipping, textile, banking and insurance firm which was based in Chennai, India
Binnie, a given name and surname
Binay, a surname

Indian surnames
Feminine given names